The Vertigo World Tour was Irish recording artist Eden's third concert tour, supporting his debut studio album Vertigo. The tour began March 2018 in North America and ended in Europe in November 2018.

Background
To accompany the release of "Gold," Eden released the dates for the tour on November 10, 2017.

Set list
This set list is representative of the Santa Ana show on March 9, 2018. It does not necessarily represent all dates throughout the tour.

 "wrong"
 "take care"
 "start//end"
 "wings"
 "icarus"
 "lost//found"
 "crash"
 "about time"
 "gold"
 "nowhere else"
 "forever//over"
 "Fumes"
 "float"
 "stutter"
 "End Credits"
 "wonder"
 "rock + roll"
 "love; not wrong (brave)
 "falling in reverse"

Shows

References

2018 concert tours